is a Japanese television drama series that aired on TV Asahi from 17 April 2009 to 19 June 2009. It is based on a book by Keigo Higashino.

Cast
 Shota Matsuda
 Yūichi Kimura
 Yuu Kashii
 Chisun
 Jingi Irie
 Ryosuke Miura
 Ryoko Kobayashi

References

Japanese drama television series
2009 Japanese television series debuts
2009 Japanese television series endings
TV Asahi television dramas
Japanese comedy television series
Mystery television series
Television shows based on Japanese novels
Television shows based on works by Keigo Higashino